Ó Ceallacháin, anglicised Callihan, is an Irish surname. Notable people with the surname include:

Seán Óg Ó Ceallacháin (1923–2013), journalist, author and broadcaster
Bill Callihan (1916–1986), American football player
Mike Callihan (b. 1947), Lieutenant Governor of Colorado
Ryan Callahan, American hockey player

See also
Callahan (disambiguation)
Callaghan (disambiguation)

References

Surnames
Irish families
Surnames of Irish origin
Irish-language surnames